Serge Colbert (born 16 June 1972) is an American composer. He is best known for the film scores for action and thriller films like The Body and Derailed. He has also composed the music for a number of film trailers like Defiance. Mission Impossible ‘’.

References

External links
 
 

1967 births
Living people
People from Newport Beach, California
American film score composers
American male film score composers